In statistics Wilks' theorem offers an asymptotic distribution of the log-likelihood ratio statistic, which can be used to produce confidence intervals for maximum-likelihood estimates or as a test statistic for performing the likelihood-ratio test.

Statistical tests (such as hypothesis testing) generally require knowledge of the probability distribution of the test statistic. This is often a problem for likelihood ratios, where the probability distribution can be very difficult to determine.

A convenient result by Samuel S. Wilks says that as the sample size approaches , the distribution of the test statistic  asymptotically approaches the chi-squared distribution under the null hypothesis . This result means that for large samples and a great variety of hypotheses, a practitioner can compute the likelihood ratio  for the data and compare  to the  value corresponding to a desired statistical significance as an approximate statistical test.

The theorem no longer applies when the true value of the parameter is on the boundary of the parameter space: Wilks’ theorem assumes that the ‘true’ but unknown values of the estimated parameters lie within the interior of the supported parameter space. In practice, one will notice the problem if the estimate lies on that boundary. In that event, the likelihood test is still a sensible test statistic and even possess some asymptotic optimality properties, but the significance (the -value) can not be reliably estimated using the chi-squared distribution with the number of degrees of freedom prescribed by Wilks. In some cases, the asymptotic null-hypothesis distribution of the statistic is a mixture of chi-square distributions with different numbers of degrees of freedom.

Use
Each of the two competing models, the null model and the alternative model, is separately fitted to the data and the log-likelihood recorded. The test statistic (often denoted by ) is twice the log of the likelihoods ratio, i.e., it is twice the difference in the log-likelihoods:

 

The model with more parameters (here alternative) will always fit at least as well — i.e., have the same or greater log-likelihood — than the model with fewer parameters (here null). Whether the fit is significantly better and should thus be preferred is determined by deriving how likely (-value) it is to observe such a difference  by chance alone, if the model with fewer parameters were true.

Certain assumptions must be met for the statistic to follow a chi-squared distribution, but empirical -values may also be computed if those conditions are not met.

Examples

Coin tossing
An example of Pearson's test is a comparison of two coins to determine whether they have the same probability of coming up heads. The observations can be put into a contingency table with rows corresponding to the coin and columns corresponding to heads or tails. The elements of the contingency table will be the number of times each coin came up heads or tails. The contents of this table are our observations .

The space of the null hypothesis  is the subspace where .

Writing  for the best estimates of  under the hypothesis , the maximum likelihood estimate is given by

Similarly, the maximum likelihood estimates of  under the null hypothesis  are given by

which does not depend on the coin .

The hypothesis and null hypothesis can be rewritten slightly so that they satisfy the constraints for the logarithm of the likelihood ratio to have the desired distribution.  Since the constraint causes the two-dimensional  to be reduced to the one-dimensional , the asymptotic distribution for the test will be , the  distribution with one degree of freedom.

For the general contingency table, we can write the log-likelihood ratio statistic as

Invalidity for random or mixed effects models
Wilks’ theorem assumes that the true but unknown values of the estimated parameters are in the interior of the parameter space. This is commonly violated in random or mixed effects models, for example, when one of the variance components is negligible relative to the others.
In some such cases, one variance component can be effectively zero, relative to the others, or in other cases the models can be improperly nested.

To be clear: These limitations on Wilks’ theorem do not negate any power properties of a particular likelihood ratio test. The only issue is that a  distribution is sometimes a poor choice for estimating the statistical significance of the result.

Bad examples
Pinheiro and Bates (2000) showed that the true distribution of this likelihood ratio chi-square statistic could be substantially different from the naïve  – often dramatically so. The naïve assumptions could give significance probabilities (-values) that are, on average, far too large in some cases and far too small in others.

In general, to test random effects, they recommend using Restricted maximum likelihood (REML). For fixed-effects testing, they say, “a likelihood ratio test for REML fits is not feasible”, because changing the fixed effects specification changes the meaning of the mixed effects, and the restricted model is therefore not nested within the larger model. As a demonstration, they set either one or two random effects variances to zero in simulated tests. (With ,  is 0 with probability 1. This means that a good approximation was )

Pinheiro and Bates also simulated tests of different fixed effects.

However, in another test of a factor with 15 levels, they found a reasonable match to  – 4 more degrees of freedom than the 14 that one would get from a naïve (inappropriate) application of Wilks’ theorem, and the simulated -value was several times the naïve . They conclude that for testing fixed effects, “it's wise to use simulation.”

See also
Bayes factor
Model selection
Sup-LR test

Notes

References

Other sources

External links
 

Statistical ratios
Statistical tests